The Fujimoto–Belleau reaction is a chemical reaction that forms cyclic α-substituted α,β-unsaturated ketones from enol lactones. The reaction was discovered in 1951 by George I. Fujimoto and Bernard Belleau. Belleau used this reaction to synthesize 1-methyl-3-keto-1,2,3,9,10,10a-hexahydrophenanthrene from a ketoacid starting material and Fujimoto demonstrated that steroids could be synthesized from naturally occurring lactone species using this method as well. 

The reaction is a Grignard reaction, followed by a H-shift, an enol-keto tautomerisation and an Aldol addition reaction. The last step is an elimination (Aldol condensation) reaction with an E1CB mechanism.

Applications of the Fujimoto-Belleau Reaction

Steroid synthesis 
The Fujimoto-Belleau reaction is used in commonly used in steroid synthesis. The reaction can be employed in the syntheses of steroids such as cholestenone, testosterone, and cortisone. Below is a scheme for the Fujimoto-Belleau reaction invoked in steroid synthesis. Note that this pathway is not the true total syntheses for these steroids.

References
 
 
 Weill-Raynal, J. Synthesis 1969, 49.

Addition reactions
Carbon-carbon bond forming reactions
Condensation reactions
Name reactions